The Struggle is a 1931 American pre-Code feature film directed by D. W. Griffith and  based on the 1877 novel L'Assommoir by Émile Zola. It was Griffith's only full-sound film besides Abraham Lincoln (1930). After several films directed by Griffith failed at the box office, The Struggle was his last film. The film was made primarily at the Audio-Cinema studios in the Bronx, New York with some outdoor filming on the streets of the Bronx.

The Struggle stars Hal Skelly, Zita Johann, Charles Richman, and in her film debut, Helen Mack. Longtime Griffith actress Kate Bruce made her final film appearance in this film as Granny, and this was also the final film for Claude Cooper.

Plot
The story begins in 1911 and extends into the Prohibition era. Jimmie got into the habit of drinking (bootleg liquor) partly due to the Prohibition law. When he falls in love with and proposes to Florrie, he makes a vow "not to take another drink". The young couple gets married, has a daughter and enjoys a happy family life until Jimmie starts drinking again due to circumstances. As Jimmie descends into alcoholism, his family falls into disarray. His sister Nan is forced to break off engagement with Johnny due to Jimmie's alcohol-fueled bad behavior. Finally, Florrie manages to save the family and nurtures Jimmie back to his feet. Nan and Johnny are reunited.

Cast
 Hal Skelly as Jimmie Wilson
 Zita Johann as Florrie
 Charlotte Wynters as Nina
 Evelyn Baldwin as Nan Wilson
 Jackson Halliday as Johnnie Marshall
 Edna Hagan as Mary
 Claude Cooper as Sam
 Arthur Lipson as Cohen
 Charles Richman as Mr. Craig
 Helen Mack as A Catty Girl
 Scott Moore as A Gigolo
 Dave Manley as A Mill Worker
 Kate Bruce as Granny (uncredited) 
 Tammany Young as Barfly (uncredited)

Production
The film was inspired in part by Griffith's own battles with alcoholism. He partly funded it with a 1929 tax refund that had been invested in stocks that did well despite the Depression. Shooting took place from July to August 1931.

Release
The film received poor reviews and was not a success at the box office. In 1935 United Artists considered re-releasing the film but could not get a Code Seal from the Breen Office unless cuts were made, so decided not to do it. In 1940 another distributor B.A. Mills considered re-releasing it under the title Ten Nights in a Barroom but encountered similar difficulties. Griffith never made another movie although he did marry an actress from the film, Evelyn Baldwin.

The film's copyright was renewed in 1959, so it will not fall into the public domain until January 1, 2027.

See also
 D. W. Griffith filmography

References

External links

The AFI Catalog of Feature Films: The Struggle
The Struggle film on Youtube

1931 films
1931 drama films
Films directed by D. W. Griffith
United Artists films
American black-and-white films
Films about alcoholism
Films with screenplays by Anita Loos
Films based on French novels
Films based on works by Émile Zola
American drama films
1930s English-language films
1930s American films